Avongrove Tea Estate is a tea garden in the Mirik CD block in the Mirik subdivision of the Darjeeling district in West Bengal, India.

Geography

Avongrove Tea Estate, located in the Rangbhang Valley, sits on the banks of the Balason River at  feet above sea level. Approximately  of land is growing tea, and there are 500 workers who live on the estate to maintain optimal plucking rounds. Avongrove means "Nest of Birds".

Avongrove is certified as an organic tea estate under USA (USA), JAS (Japan), NOP and NPOP (India and the EU).

Note: The map alongside presents some of the notable locations in the subdivision. All places marked in the map are linked in the larger full screen map.

Production
The factory was built in 1889 and produces  of tea a year. The estate has a perennial source of water and almost the entire area under tea can be irrigated.

Economy
Approximately 60% of the area under tea has chinary and chinary clonal bushes. Of the 40% that remains, about 20% are hybrid bushes and a very small percentage are pure Assam tea.

Avongrove offers a range of specialty Darjeeling tea, such as the peony rosette and florette, the latter of which expands when allowed to gently brew in a tall container, revealing a flower when the hot water makes the outer leaves unfurl. One woman, working an entire day, can make only six of them.

References

Tea estates in Darjeeling district